Cliopsis Troschel, 1854 is a genus of sea angels belonging to the family Cliopsidae. It is monotypic, being represented by the single species Cliopsis krohnii.

Taxonomy
The Marine Species Identification Portal recognizes three morphs :
 Cliopsis krohni morpha grandis Boas, 1886; body length : 40 mm
 Cliopsis krohni morpha krohni Troschel, 1854; body length : 24 mm
 Cliopsis krohni morpha modesta (Pelseneer, 1887); body length : 3 mm

Description 
Cliopsis krohnii has a  somewhat long, flabby, gelatinous body with a bluish aspect. The head is rather small with the nuchal tentacles much developed. The posterior gill possesses four distinct radiating hexagonal crests lacking foldings or fringes. The foot is reduced to three small median lobes. The anterior lobes of the foot show a posterior right angle. The posterior end of the foot has a folded tubercle that is not divided by longitudinal wrinkle in the middle. The distal extremities of the fins are rounded. It  lacks a shell except during its early embryonic stage. The small lateral winglike flaps (parapodia) are used in a slow swimming mode.

This species is a highly specialized predator. It preys on pseudothecosomes, such as Corolla. On making contact with the wide mucous web of its victim, it grabs the victim with a long proboscis (up to twice its own length), chitinous hooks (with the hook sacs containing about 60 hooks) and cutting radular teeth. They can eat victims three times their own size.

Distribution and habitat
Cliopsis krohnii is a small free-swimming sea slug, found in all warm and temperate seas where it is pelagic and lives amidst plankton as deep as 1,500 m.

References

External links 
Report of the Scientific results of the Voyage of the H.M.S. Challenger (1873-1876), Zoology, part LVIII (1887) : Report on the Pteropoda by Paul Pelseneer
WoRMS : Cliopsis krohnii

Further reading 
Gofas, S.; Le Renard, J.; Bouchet, P. (2001). Mollusca, in: Costello, M.J. et al. (Ed.) (2001). European register of marine species: a check-list of the marine species in Europe and a bibliography of guides to their identification. Collection Patrimoines Naturels, 50: pp. 180–213
Rolán, E. (2005). Malacological fauna from the Cape Verde Archipelago: 1. Polyplacophora and Gastropoda. ConchBooks: Hackenheim, Germany. . 455 pp.
Willan, R. (2009). Opisthobranchia (Mollusca). In: Gordon, D. (Ed.) (2009). New Zealand Inventory of Biodiversity. Volume One: Kingdom Animalia. 584 pp

Cliopsidae
Gastropods described in 1854
Taxa named by Franz Hermann Troschel